Nicholas Tofowomo is Nigerian Politician, He is the Senator representing Ondo South Senatorial District of Ondo State at the 9th National Assembly.

Polictical career
Tofowomo served as the commissioner for transport during the administration of Olusegun Mimiko, he was elected as the candidate of the People's Democratic Party on October 3, 2018 having polled 241 votes with Engr. Ademulegun polling 227 votes and the former Commissioner for Environment, Sola Ebiseni polled 177 votes at the primary election.

On February 25, 2019, in a supplementary election, he was elected as senator representing Ondo South defeating the incumbent Yele Omogunwa, who scored 51,993 votes, having polled 79,036 votes. Tofowomo appointed 46 aides on July 24, 2019.

On 6 September 2019, He was involved in a car accident where he suffered a bone fracture.

On 6 February 2020, he was named in a 56-man Constitution Review Committee.

Bills And Motions
 National institute of Glass Development And Training Igbo,koda  , Ondo State (Establishment)Bill.
 Bitumen Training Institute in Ode, Aye, Ondo State. (Establishment) Bill.
 National Health Insurance Act (Rapeal and Re-enactment) Bill
 Nigeria's Real Estate Regulatory Council (Establishment) Bill.
 Federal University Of Agriculture, Akure, Ondo State (Establishment)Bill.
 Tertiary Education Trust Found Act (Amendment) Bill.
 Federal School Of Basic Studies Ile-Oluji, (Establishment) Bill.
 Nigeria Cocoa Development Council (Establishment) bill.
 Federal Medical Centre Ode-irela,Ondo State (Establishment) Bill.
 College Of Maritime Studies And Naval Architecture (Establishment) Bill.
 Araromi Sea front port, Ondo, State (Establishment) Bill .
 Institute Of Culture And Tourism Oke-Igbo, Ondo State (Establishment ) Bill.
 Federal College Of Fisheries And Aquatic Studies Awoye, Ondo State (Establishment ) Bill.
 Federal University Of Entrepreneur Odogbe, Ondo State (Establishment ) Bill.

Motions
 Senator Nicholas Tofowomo has raised concern over the pitiable condition of the federal road maintenance Agency FERMA to repair all the bad roads in Ondo State to reduce accident.
 Senator Nicholas Tofowomo raised the motion of repair bridge in Ijaw part of Ondo-south

Constituency Projects
Senator Nicholas Tofowomo has constituency projects spread across all the Six local government areas in his Senatorial District (Ondo South) As a senator, he has not hidden his passion for the development of his people and his country since he assumed office. Senator Nicholas Tofowomo alone has facilitated more than 50 intervention projects across his Senatorial District. These projects include: construction blocks of classrooms, modern primary Health care centers, rural electrification and drilling of motorized boreholes in different communities. Senator Nicholas Tofowomo  also, facilitated graduate and non-graduate job opportunities for youths in his Senatorial District. The Senator has used his office to facilitate numerous Economic Empowerment for youths and women in his Senatorial District, providing them with income generating items and start-up grants to commence a viable business; the income generating items include: 350 motorcycles, 111 Tricycles, 211 Tomato Grinding Machines, 311 Sewing machines, 86 Hair Dryers, 45 Deep Freezers and 50Generators. Senator Nicholas Tofowomo has so far facilitated the construction of 9 Roads, 28 Blocks of Class Rooms, 4 Health Care Centre  8 Transformers, over 500 poles of Solar Powered Street Lights. The Senator, in the area of agriculture, has donated over 4000 bags of NPK fertilizers to farmers in his Senatorial District.

Committee
 Vice Chairman Senate committee on Transport 
 Member, Senate committee on Maritime Transport.
 Member, Senate committee on Aviation.
 Member, Senate committee on Agriculture.
 Member, Senate committee on Works.
 Member, Senate committee on FERMA.

References

1960 births
Living people
Politicians from Ondo State
Peoples Democratic Party (Nigeria) politicians by state